The Order of Columbus was a short-lived Brazilian order of merit. It was instituted on 6 June 1890, just two months after the abolition of all Imperial Brazilian Orders.

The first constitution of the Brazilian republic abolished the order of Columbus on 24 February 1891.

The Order consisted of:
 a Grandmaster,
 twelve real and twenty-four honorary grand-crosses,
 fifty dignitaries (Grand-officers),
 one-hundred and fifty officers, and an unlimited number of knights.

Columbus
1890 establishments in Brazil
Awards established in 1890

References